Tuleš is a village in the municipality of Aleksandrovac, Serbia. According to the 2002 census, the village has a population of 496.

References

Populated places in Rasina District